Two Sisters from Boston is a 1946 musical comedy film directed by Henry Koster and starring Kathryn Grayson, June Allyson, Lauritz Melchior, Jimmy Durante and Peter Lawford. The film features songs by Sammy Fain and Ralph Freed.

Plot
Abigail, a young lady from Boston, leaves home to go to New York City for singing lessons in pursuit of her grand ambition to sing for the Metropolitan Opera. Unable to make ends meet, she takes a job singing in a Bowery beer hall without telling anyone from her family back home.

When a rumor gets back to Boston that Abigail is performing at a beer hall and showing her limbs, her family is shocked and they decide that they must come to New York and investigate the rumor. Abigail then lies to her family and claims to sing in the Metropolitan Opera, not a beer hall. She even sneaks into a performance at the Met, persuading her family that she really is a singer there, despite causing a mishap that interferes with Olaf Olstrom, the company's top tenor.

Martha, Abigail’s sister, eventually figures things out. She decides that she must help Abigail really get into the opera so that Abigail can leave her scandalous job at the beer hall. Along the way, Martha must cover for Abigail and protect the secret of her job at the beer hall. Martha ends up meeting a young man named Lawrence and begins a romance with him.

Cast
 Kathryn Grayson as Abigail Chandler
 June Allyson as Martha Chandler
 Peter Lawford as Lawrence
 Jimmy Durante as Spike
 Lauritz Melchior as Olstrom
 Nella Walker as Mrs. Patterson
 Byron Foulger as Recording Technician (uncredited)
 Lionel Braham as Opera Singer (uncredited)
 Adriana Caselotti as Opera Singer (uncredited)

Songs 
Music by Sammy Fain, lyrics by Ralph Freed.
 "There's Two Sides to Ev'ry Girl"
 "Nellie Martin"
 "The Firechief's Daughter"
 "G'Wan Home Your Mudder's Callin'"
 "Down By the Ocean"
 "After the Show"

Reception
According to MGM records, the film was a hit, making $3,334,000 in the US and Canada and $1,127,000 elsewhere, leading to a profit of $605,000.

Influence
The English post-punk band The Chameleons used a sample from the film as the introduction to the song "Don't Fall," the first song on their 1983 debut album Script of the Bridge. The scene features Lawford's character, Lawrence Tyburt Patterson, Jr., asking his mother, played by Nella Walker, about the age of his father.  After she tells him that his father is younger than he looks and still 'spry,' Patterson, Jr. says "In his autumn, before the winter, comes man's last mad surge of youth." His mother quickly replies, "What on earth are you talking about?" These two lines consist of the sample as used by the Chameleons. Patterson, Jr. goes on to say that he is quoting the ancient Greek dramatist Sophocles, but the quote itself appears to be either apocryphal, misattributed by the screenwriters or else created by them originally. The Chameleons also used the same sample on an otherwise instrumental recording from the same period, "Prisoners of the Sun."

References

External links
 
 
 
 

1946 films
1946 musical comedy films
American musical comedy films
American black-and-white films
1940s English-language films
Films directed by Henry Koster
Films produced by Joe Pasternak
Films set in 1903
Films set in Massachusetts
Films set in New York City
Metro-Goldwyn-Mayer films
1940s American films